Shane Calisa de Silva (born 22 September 1972) is a Trinidadian former cricketer and FIFA-certified football referee.

As a cricketer, she played as a left-handed batter and slow left-arm orthodox bowler. She appeared in 18 One Day Internationals for the West Indies between 2003 and 2005, making her debut at the age of 31. She played domestic cricket for Trinidad and Tobago.

She is a FIFA licensed referee, registered in Trinidad and Tobago since 2002.

References

External links

1972 births
Living people
Trinidad and Tobago women cricketers
Trinidad and Tobago football referees
West Indies women One Day International cricketers
West Indian women cricketers
Women referees and umpires